This is the discography for American jazz musician Kenny Barron.

Albums

As leader/co-leader

As band member
With the Classical Jazz Quartet
 Tchaikovsky's The Nutcracker (Vertical Jazz, 2001)
 The Classical Jazz Quartet Play Bach (Vertical Jazz, 2002)
 The Classical Jazz Quartet Play Rachmaninov (Kind of Blue, 2006) – recorded in 2002

With Sphere
Four in One (Elektra/Musician, 1982)
Flight Path (Elektra/Musician, 1983) 
Sphere On Tour (Red, 1985)
Four for All (Verve, 1987)
Bird Songs (Verve, 1988)
Pumpkin's Delight (Red, 1993) – recorded in 1986
Sphere (Verve, 1997)

With the Super Premium Band
Softly, as in a Morning Sunrise (Happinet, 2010)
Sounds of New York (Happinet, 2011)

As sideman 

With Clifford Adams
The Master Power (Naxos Jazz, 1998)
With Eddie Allen
Remembrance (Venus, 1993)
With Harry Allen
A Little Touch of Harry (MasterMix, 1997)
With Eric Alexander
Full Range (Criss Cross, 1994)
With Ray Alexander
Rain in June (Nerus, 1992) 
With Karrin Allyson
Many a New Day: Karrin Allyson Sings Rodgers & Hammerstein (Motéma, 2015)
With Franco Ambrosetti
Live at the Blue Note (Enja, 1993) 
With Curtis Amy
Mustang (Verve, 1967)
With Ray Anderson
Old Bottles - New Wine (Enja, 1985)
With Tim Armacost
Fire (Concord Jazz, 1995)
With Chet Baker
You Can't Go Home Again (Horizon, 1977) 
The Best Thing for You (A&M, 1977 [1989])
Studio Trieste (CTI, 1982) with Jim Hall and Hubert Laws
But Not For Me (Stash, 1982 [1994])
With Bill Barron
The Tenor Stylings of Bill Barron (Savoy, 1961)
Modern Windows (Savoy, 1961)
Hot Line (Savoy, 1962 [1964])
The Brasileros – Bossa Nova (Diplomat, 1963)
West Side Story Bossa Nova (Dauntless, 1963)
Now, Hear This! (Audio Fidelity, 1963) with Ted Curson
Motivation (Savoy, 1972)
Jazz Caper (Muse, 1978 [1982])
Variations in Blue (Muse, 1983)
Live at Cobi's 2 (SteepleChase, 1885 [2006])
The Next Plateau (Muse, 1987 [1989])
Higher Ground (Joken, 1989)
With Gary Bartz
There Goes The Neighborhood (Candid, 1990)
Alto Memories (Verve, 1993) with Sonny Fortune
With Alvin Batiste
Late (CBS, 1993)
With Stefano di Battista
Parker's Mood (Blue Note, 2004)
With Sathima Bea Benjamin
Windsong (Ekapa/BlackHawk, 1985)
Southern Touch (Enja, 1989 [1992]) 
With George Benson
Bad Benson (CTI, 1974)
With Cheryl Bentyne
Talk of the Town (Telarc, 2002 [2004])
Cheryl Bentyne Sings Waltz for Debby (King, 2004) 
With Jerry Bergonzi, Victor Lewis and Bobby Watson
Together Again for the First Time (Red, 1996 [1998]) 
With Cindy Blackman
Code Red (Muse, 1990 [1992])
The Oracle (Muse, 1995)
With John Blake
Maiden Dance (Gramavision, 1984) 
With Marion Brown
Soul Eyes (Baystate, 1978)
With Joshua Breakstone
Remembering Grant Green (Evidence, 1983 [1996])
4/4 = 1 (Sonora, 1985) 
Echoes (Contemporary, 1987)
Self-Portrait in Swing (Contemporary, 1989)
Walk Don't Run (King, 1992)
Sittin' On the Thing With Ming (Capri, 1993) 
With Teresa Brewer
Memories of Louis (Red Baron, 1991)
Softly I Swing (Red Baron, 1991)
With Nick Brignola
Raincheck (Reservoir, 1988) 
On a Different Level (Reservoir, 1989) 
What It Takes (Reservoir, 1990)
It's Time (Reservoir, 1992)
Flight of the Eagle (Reservoir, 1996)
With Jeanie Bryson
I Love Being Here with You (Telarc, 1993) 
With Dave Burns
Dave Burns (Vanguard, 1962)
With the Candid Jazz Masters
For Miles (Candid, 1991 [1995])
With Ann Hampton Callaway
After Ours (Denon, 1994 [1997])
Signature (After 9, 2001)
With Terri Lyne Carrington
TLC and Friends (CEI, 1981)
With Benny Carter
All That Jazz – Live at Princeton (MusicMasters, 1990)
With Regina Carter
Rhythms of the Heart (Verve, 1999) 
With Ron Carter
Yellow & Green (CTI, 1976)
Pastels (Milestone, 1976)
Piccolo (Milestone, 1977)
Peg Leg (Milestone, 1977)
A Song for You (Milestone, 1978)
Pick 'Em (Milestone, 1978 [1980])
New York Slick (Milestone, 1979)
Patrão (Milestone, 1980)
Super Strings (Milestone, 1981)
Friends (Blue Note, 1993) 
Jazz, My Romance (Blue Note, 1994)
 So What? (Blue Note, 1998)
With Joe Chambers
New York Concerto (Baystate, 1981)
With Ed Cherry
First Take (Groovin' High, 1993)
A Second Look (Groovin' High, 1994 [1997])
With Billy Cobham 
The Art of Three (In + Out, 2001)
With Jay Collins
Uncommon Threads (Reservoir, 1994)
With Continuum
Mad About Tadd (Palo Alto, 1980)
With Keith Copeland
On Target (JazzMania, 1993)
With Larry Coryell
Shining Hour (Muse, 1989)
With Ted Curson
Quicksand (Atlantic, 1974)
With Charles Davis
Dedicated to Tadd (West 54, 1979)
With Santi Debriano
Obeah (Free Lance, 1987)
With Ray Drummond
Camera in a Bag (Criss Cross, 1990)
Continuum (Arabesque, 1994)
With Ted Dunbar
Secundum Artem (Xanadu, 1980) 
With Madeline Eastman
Art Attack (Mad Kat, 1994) 
With Booker Ervin
Booker 'n' Brass (Pacific Jazz, 1967)
Tex Book Tenor (Blue Note, 1968)
With Jon Faddis
Youngblood (Pablo, 1976)
Legacy (Concord Jazz, 1985)
With Dominick Farinacci
Lovers, Tales & Dances (Koch, 2008)
With Ella Fitzgerald
All That Jazz (Pablo, 1989)
With Sonny Fortune
Awakening (Horizon, 1975)
Serengeti Minstrel (Atlantic, 1977)
Laying It Down (Konnex, 1984)
A Better Understanding (Blue Note, 1995)
With Frank Foster and Frank Wess
Two for the Blues (Pablo, 1984) 
Frankly Speaking (Concord, 1985)
With Joel Frahm
We Used to Dance (Anzic, 2006) 
With Michael Franks
Tiger in the Rain (Warner Bros., 1978)
With Rebecca Coupe Franks
Suit of Armor (Justice, 1991) 
With Nnenna Freelon
Heritage (Columbia, 1993) 
With Chico Freeman
The Search (India Navigation, 1980 [1983])
Freeman & Freeman (India Navigation, 1981 [1989]) with Von Freeman
Fathers and Sons (Columbia, 1982) with Von Freeman
Groovin' Late (Jazz Road, 1986) 
With George Freeman
 Man & Woman (Groove Merchant, 1974)
With Al Gafa
Leblon Beach (Pablo, 1976)
With Stan Getz
Voyage (BlackHawk, 1986)
Anniversary! (Emarcy, 1987 [1989])
Serenity (Emarcy, 1987 [1991])
Bossas & Ballads – The Lost Sessions (Verve, 1989 [2003])
Yours and Mine (Concord, 1989 [1996])
Soul Eyes (Concord, 1989 [1997]) 
Apasionado (A&M, 1989)
The Final Concert Recording (Eagle, 1990 [2000])
People Time: The Complete Recordings (EmArcy, 1991 [2CD 1992]; Sunnyside, [7CD 2010]) 
With Shannon Gibbons
Shannon Gibbons (Soul Note, 1987)
With Gerry Gibbs
Gerry Gibbs Thrasher Dream Trio (Whaling City Sound, 2014)
We're Back (Whaling City Sound, 2014) 
With Dizzy Gillespie
Something Old, Something New (Philips, 1963)
Dizzy Gillespie and the Double Six of Paris (Philips, 1963)
Dizzy Goes Hollywood (Philips, 1963)
The Cool World (Philips, 1964)
Jambo Caribe (Limelight, 1964)
I/We Had a Ball (Limelight, 1965) - 1 track
Charlie Parker 10th Memorial Concert (Limelight, 1965) 
The Melody Lingers On (Limelight, 1966)
With Benny Golson
Time Speaks (Baystate, 1983) with Freddie Hubbard and Woody Shaw
With Duško Gojković
Bebop City (Enja, 1994 [1996]) 
With Al Grey and J. J. Johnson
Things Are Getting Better All the Time (Pablo, 1983)
With Johnny Griffin
Chicago, New York, Paris (Verve, 1995) 
With Earl & Carl Grubbs (The Visitors)
Rebirth (Muse, 1974) 
With Jim Hall
Panorama: Live at the Village Vanguard (Telarc, 1996
With Billy Harper
Knowledge of Self (Denon, 1978)
With Tom Harrell
Look to the Sky (SteepleChase, 1979) with John McNeil
Moon Alley (Criss Cross Jazz, 1985)
With Eddie Harris
There Was a Time – Echo of Harlem (Enja, 1990) 
With Louis Hayes
Light and Lively (SteepleChase, 1989)
Una Max (SteepleChase, 1990) 
With Roy Haynes
Togyu (RCA, 1975)
Love Letters (Eighty-Eight's, 2002) 
With Albert Heath
Kwanza (The First) (Muse, 1973)
With Jimmy Heath
The Gap Sealer (Muse, 1973)
With Eddie Henderson
Phantoms (SteepleChase, 1989)
Think On Me (SteepleChase, 1989)
With Joe Henderson
The Kicker (Milestone, 1967)
Tetragon (Milestone, 1968)
With Buck Hill
This Is Buck Hill (SteepleChase, 1978)
Scope (SteepleChase, 1979)
With Steve Hobbs
On the Lower East Side (Candid, 1993 [1995]) 
Second Encounter (Candid, 1994 [2003])
With Ron Holloway
Struttin (Milestone, 1995)With Freddie HubbardHigh Blues Pressure (Atlantic, 1968)
A Soul Experiment (Atlantic, 1969)
The Black Angel (Atlantic, 1969)
Sing Me a Song of Songmy (Atlantic, 1971) with İlhan Mimaroğlu
Super Blue (Columbia, 1978)
Outpost (Enja, 1981)
The Rose Tattoo (Baystate, 1983)With Bobby HutchersonNow! (Blue Note, 1969)
In the Vanguard (Landmark, 1987)With Jon IrabagonThe Observer (Concord Jazz, 2009)With Pucci Amanda JhonesSweet Dreams (Cadence, 1997)With Elvin JonesNew Agenda (Vanguard, 1975) 
Time Capsule (Vanguard, 1977)With Sam JonesThe Bassist! (Interplay, 1979)With Sheila JordanThe Crossing (BlackHawk, 1984 [1986]) 
Body and Soul (CBS/Sony, 1986)
Lost and Found (Muse, 1989) 
One for Junior (Muse, 1991 [1993]) with Mark Murphy With Geoffrey KeezerSublime: Honoring the Music of Hank Jones (Telarc, 2002) With Barney KesselRed Hot and Blues (Contemporary, 1988)With Kiyoshi KitagawaAncestry (Atelier Sawano, 2003)
Prayer (Atelier Sawano, 2005)
Live at Tsutenkaku (Atelier Sawano, 2006)  With Eric KlossWe're Goin' Up (Prestige, 1967)With Cullen KnightLooking Up (Cullen Knight Music, 1977)With Lee KonitzJazz Nocturne (Venus/Evidence, 1992 [1994])With Ralph LalamaMomentum (Criss Cross, 1991) With Yusef LateefThe Centaur and the Phoenix (Riverside, 1960) – arranger only
The Gentle Giant (Atlantic, 1971)
Hush 'N' Thunder (Atlantic, 1972)
Part of the Search (Atlantic, 1973)
10 Years Hence (Atlantic, 1974)
The Doctor Is In... and Out (Atlantic, 1976)With Babatunde LeaLevel of Intent (Diaspora, 1991 [1995])With Keiko LeeImagine (Sony, 1995) 
Beautiful Love (Sony, 1997)With Abbey LincolnA Turtle's Dream (Verve, 1994)
It's Me (Verve, 2002) With Kevin MahoganyDouble Rainbow (Enja, 1993)With Ann MalcolmIncident'ly (Sound Hills, 1993) With Russell MaloneSweet Georgia Peach (GRP/Impulse!, 1998)
Heartstrings (Verve, 2001)  With Claire MartinToo Much in Love to Care (Linn, 2012) With Mel MartinMel Martin Plays Benny Carter (Enja, 1994)   With Greg MarvinWorkout! (Criss Cross, 1988) With Virginia MayhewNini Green (Chiaroscuro, 1997)
No Walls (Foxhaven, 2000) With Christian McBrideNumber Two Express (Verve, 1995)With Tom McIntoshWith Malice Toward None: The Music Of Tom McIntosh (IPO, 2003)With MeecoPerfume e Caricias (Connector, 2010)With Helen MerrillBrownie: Homage to Clifford Brown (Verve, 1994)With Red MitchellTalking (Capri, 1989 [1991])With Bill MobleyTriple Bill (Evidence, 1993) With Jane MonheitNever Never Land (N-Coded Music, 2000)
Come Dream with Me (N-Coded Music, 2001) With James MoodyAnother Bag (Argo, 1962)
Comin' On Strong (Cadet, 1963)
Moody and the Brass Figures (Milestone, 1966)
The Blues and Other Colors (Milestone, 1969)
Feelin' It Together (Muse, 1973)
Timeless Aura (Vanguard, 1976)
Sun Journey  (Vanguard, 1976)
Moving Forward (Novus, 1987)
Honey (Novus, 1990)
Moody 4A (IPO, 2008)
Moody 4B (IPO, 2008 [2010])  With Frank MorganYou Must Believe in Spring (Antilles, 1992) With Mark MorganelliSpeak Low (Candid, 1990) With Sam MostFrom the Attic of My Mind (Xanadu, 1978 [1980])With Bob MoverBob Mover (Vanguard, 1977)
It Amazes Me... ( 	Zoho Music, 2006 [2008])  With Idris MuhammadPeace and Rhythm (Prestige, 1971)With Maria MuldaurSweet And Slow (Tudor, 1983) 
Transblucency (Uptown, 1984 [1986])With Judy Niemack Heart's Desire (Stash, 1992)With Bobbe NorrisYou and the Night and the Music (CBS/Sony, 1986) With Tiger OkoshiColor of Soil (JVC, 1998)   With Jimmy OwensNo Escaping It (Polydor, 1970)
Jimmy Owens (A&M/Horizon, 1976)
Headin' Home (A&M/Horizon, 1978)
The Monk Project (IPO, 2011) With Nathen PagePage-ing Nathen (Hudo's Music, 1982)With P.J. PerryWorth Waiting For (Jazz Alliance, 1991)With 'Hannibal' Marvin PetersonNaima (East World, 1978)
The Angels of Atlanta (Enja, 1981)With Valery PonomarevProfile (Reservoir, 1991) With Benny PowellWhy Don't You Say "Yes" Sometime?! (Inspire Productions, 1991)With Roland PrinceColor Visions (Vanguard, 1976)
Free Spirit (Vanguard, 1977)with Judy RafatCon Alma – A Tribute to Dizzy Gillespie (Timeless, 1996) With Dianne ReevesThe Grand Encounter (Blue Note, 1996)With Justin RobinsonJustin Time (Verve, 1991)With Perry RobinsonFunk Dumpling (Savoy, 1962)With Claudio RoditiMilestones (Candid, 1990 [1992]) With Buddy RichTransition (Groove Merchant, 1974) with Lionel Hampton
Very Live at Buddy's Place (Groove Merchant, 1974)
The Last Blues Album Volume 1 (Groove Merchant, 1974)
Speak No Evil (RCA, 1976)With Ali RyersonBlue Flute (Red Baron, 1992)
I'll Be Back (Red Baron, 1993) With David SanbornPearls (Elektra, 1995)With Randy SandkeGet Happy (Concord Jazz, 1993)With Arturo SandovalA Time for Love (Concord Jazz, 2010)With David SchnitterThundering (Muse, 1978)
Glowing (Muse, 1981)With Jimmy ScottAll The Way (Blue Horizon, 1992) With Doug SertlUptown Express (Palo Alto, 1983) With Bud ShankThis Bud's for You... (Muse, 1984)
I Told You So! (Candid, 1992) With Woody ShawSolid (Muse, 1986)With Charlie ShoemakeSunstroke (Muse, 1978)
Blue Shoe (Muse, 1979)With Janis SiegelExperiment in White (Atlantic, 1981)With Carol SloaneLove You Madly (Contemporary, 1988)With Jeffery SmithA Little Sweeter (Verve, 1996)With Tommy SmithThe Sound of Love (Linn, 1997)
Spartacus (Spartacus, 2000)With James SpauldingSongs of Courage (Muse, 1991 [1993])With Peter Spraguehe Message Sent on the Wind (Xanadau, 1982)With Charles SullivanRe-Entry (Whynot, 1975)
Kamau (Arabesque, 1995)With John Swana In the Moment (Criss Cross, 1996) With Grady TateAll Love (Village, 2002)With Alex TerrierAlex Terrier NYQ (Barking Cat, 2014)With Buddy TerryPure Dynamite (Mainstream, 1972)With Clark TerryOne on One (Chesky, 2000) With Bob Thiele CollectiveLouis Satchmo (Red Baron, 1991)
Lion-Hearted (Red Baron, 1993) With Steve TurreColors for the Masters (Smoke Sessions, 2016) With Stanley TurrentineA Bluish Bag (Blue Note, 1967 [2007])With Michal UrbaniakMusic For Violin & Jazz Quartet (JAM, 1981)
Songbird (SteepleChase, 1990)  With Tom VarnerJazz French Horn (Soul Note, 1985)With Millie VernonOver the Rainbow (CBS/Sony, 1986)  With Roseanna VitroListen Here (Texas Rose, 1984)With Melissa Walker I Saw the Sky (Enja, 2000) With Bennie WallaceThe Nearness of You (Justin Time, 2004) With Tyrone WashingtonNatural Essence (Blue Note, 1967)With Ernie WattsThe Long Road Home (JVC, 1996)With Frank WessTwo at the Top (Uptown, 1983)  with Johnny Coles
Magic 101 (IPO, 2011)
Magic 201 (IPO, 2011 [2014]) With Mark WhitfieldPatrice (Warner Bros., 1991)With Barney Wilen New York Romance (Venus, 1994)With Ed Wiley, Jr.About the Soul (Talking House Productions / Swing Records, 2006)With Buster WilliamsCrystal Reflections (Muse, 1976)
Tokudo (Denon, 1978)
Heartbeat (Muse, 1978)
Dreams Come True (Buddah, 1978 [1980])
65 Roses (BluePort Jazz, 2006 [2008]) With Tom WilliamsIntroducing Tom Williams (Criss Cross, 1991)With Hal WilnerAmarcord Nino Rota (Hannabal, 1981)
That's The Way I Feel Now (A&M, 1984) With Gerald WilsonNew York, New Sound (Mack Avenue, 2003)With Joe Lee WilsonHey Look at You (East Wind, 1975)With Pete YellinDance of Allegra (Mainstream, 1973)With Finn Ziegler'''A Beautiful Friendship'' (Universal, 2003)

References 

Discographies of American artists
Jazz discographies